David William "Gump" Ariail (December 29, 1910 – February 10, 2001) was a college football player.

College football
Arial was an All-Southern end for the Auburn Tigers of Auburn University. He was a teammate of College Football Hall of Fame inductee Jimmy Hitchcock. One source writes "Other than Jimmy Hitchcock, back, and "Gump" Arial, end, Auburn has no outstanding players." He was selected All-American by the "captain's poll," selected by the captains of major college football programs.

References

External links

American football ends
All-Southern college football players
Auburn Tigers football players
All-American college football players
1910 births
2001 deaths
Players of American football from Birmingham, Alabama